Baguio (
 ), officially the City of Baguio, is a 1st class highly urbanized city in the Cordillera Administrative Region, Philippines.

Baguio was established as a hill station by the United States in 1900 at the site of an Ibaloi village known as Kafagway. It was the United States' only hill station in Asia.

Baguio is classified as a Highly-Urbanized City (HUC). It is geographically located within Benguet, serving as the provincial capital from 1901 to 1916, but has since been administered independently from the province following its conversion into a chartered city. The city is the center of business, commerce, and education in northern Luzon, as well as the seat of government of the Cordillera Administrative Region. According to the 2020 census, Baguio has a population of 366,358.

Etymology 
Baguio was called "Kafagway" by indigenous peoples. The name "Baguio" originates from the American period and is derived from the Ibaloi word bagiw (moss), which was then Hispanicized as "Baguio". A demonym for natives of the city, "Ibagiw", is also derived from bagiw. It is also the name for the city's annual arts festival.

History

Pre-colonial period
Baguio used to be a vast mountain zone with lush highland forests, teeming with various wildlife such as the indigenous deer, cloud rats, Philippine eagles, Philippine warty pigs, and numerous species of flora. The area was a hunting ground of the indigenous peoples, notably the Ibalois and other Igorot ethnic groups. When the Spanish arrived in the Philippines, the area was never fully subjugated by Spain due to the intensive defense tactics of the indigenous Igorots of the Cordilleras.

Igorot oral history states the Benguet upper class, baknang, was founded between 1565 and the early 1600s, by the marriage of a gold trader, Amkidit, and a Kankanay maiden gold panning in Acupan. Their son, Baruy, discovered a gold deposit in the area, which he developed with hired workers and slaves.

Spanish colonial period
In 1755, the Augustinian Fray Pedro de Vivar established a mission in Tonglo (Tongdo) outside Baguio. Before he was driven out the following year, this rancheria included 220 people, including several baknang families. The Spanish tried to regain the mission in 1759, but were ambushed. This prompted the Governor General Pedro Manuel de Arandía Santisteban to send Don Manuel Arza de Urrutia on a punitive expedition, which resulted in the mission being burned to the ground.

During the period of Spanish rule in 1846, the Spaniards established a comandancia in the nearby town of La Trinidad, and organized Benguet into 31 rancherías, one of which was Kafagway, a wide grassy area where the present Burnham Park is situated. Kafagway was then a minor rancheria consisting of only about 20 houses. Most of the lands in Kafagway were owned by Mateo Cariño, who served as its chieftain. The Spanish presidencia, which was located at Bag-iw at the vicinity of Guisad Valley was later moved to Cariño's house where the current city hall stands. Bag-iw, a local term for "moss" once abundant in the area was spelled by the Spaniards as Baguio, which served as the name of the rancheria.

During the Philippine Revolution in July 1899, Filipino revolutionary forces under Pedro Paterno liberated La Trinidad from the Spaniards and took over the government, proclaiming Benguet as a province of the new Philippine Republic. Baguio was converted into a "town", with Mateo Cariño being the presidente (mayor).

American colonial period

When the United States occupied the Philippines after the Spanish–American War, Baguio was selected to become the summer capital of the then Philippine Islands. Governor-General William Taft, on his first visit in 1901, noted the "air as bracing as Adirondacks or Murray Bay..."

In 1903, Filipinos, Japanese and Chinese workers were hired to build Kennon Road, the first road directly connecting Baguio with the lowlands of La Union and Pangasinan. Before this, the only road to Benguet was Naguilian Road, and it was largely a horse trail at higher elevations. Camp John Hay was established in October 1903, after President Theodore Roosevelt signed an executive order setting aside land in Benguet for a military reservation for the United States Army to rest and recuperate from the lowland heat. It was named after Roosevelt's Secretary of State, John Milton Hay.

The Mansion, built in 1908, served as the official residence of the American Governor-General during the summer to escape Manila's heat. The Mansion was designed by architect William E. Parsons based on preliminary plans by architect Daniel Burnham.

Burnham, one of the earliest successful modern city planners, designed the mountain retreat following the tenets of the City Beautiful movement. In 1904, the rest of the city was planned out by Burnham. On September 1, 1909, Baguio was declared as a chartered city and nicknamed the "Summer Capital of the Philippines".

The succeeding period saw further developments of and in Baguio with the construction of Wright Park in honor of Governor-General Luke Edward Wright, Burnham Park in honor of Burnham, Governor Pack Road, and Session Road.

World War II

Prior to World War II, Baguio was the summer capital of the Commonwealth of the Philippines, and the home of the Philippine Military Academy.  As such, it was very important in military and political terms. Philippine President Manuel Quezon was even in Baguio when the war began.

On December 8, 1941, 17 Japanese bombers attacked Camp John Hay,as part of the first Japanese air raid on Luzon. Baguio was declared an open city in December 27.

Following the Japanese invasion of the Philippines in 1941, the Imperial Japanese Army used Camp John Hay, an American installation in Baguio, as a military base. The nearby Philippine Constabulary base, Camp Holmes, was used as an internment camp for about 500 civilian enemy aliens, mostly Americans, between April 1942 and December 1944.

By late March 1945, Baguio was within range of the American and Filipino military artillery. President José P. Laurel of the Second Philippine Republic, a puppet state established in 1943, departed the city on March 22 and reached Taiwan eight days later, on March 30. The remainder of the Second Republic government, along with Japanese civilians, were ordered to evacuate Baguio on March 30. General Tomoyuki Yamashita and his staff then relocated to Bambang, Nueva Vizcaya.

A major offensive to capture Baguio did not occur until April 1945, when the USAFIP-NL's 1st Battalion of the 66th Infantry, attached with the United States Army's 37th Infantry Division, the USAFIP-NL's 2nd Battalion of 66th Infantry, attached with the US 33rd Infantry Division, and the USAFIP-NL's 3rd Battalion of the 66th Infantry, converged on Baguio. By April 27, 1945, the city was liberated and the joint force moved on to liberate the Trinidad valley.

Baguio is the site of the formal surrender of General Yamashita and Vice Admiral Okochi at Camp John Hay's American Residence in the presence of lieutenant generals Arthur Percival and Jonathan Wainwright.

Post-World War II 

Baguio ceased to be the official "Summer Capital of the Philippines" in 1976.

In the wake of the Snap Presidential elections of 1986 antidictatorship organizers were based largely in the Azotea Building midway up Session Road, and in Cafe Amapola further up Session, on its intersection with Governor Pack road.  Because the United States' Armed Forces Radio and Television Network station at Camp John Hay was transmitting news from Manila, they learned early on that the People Power revolution had begun in Manila. Deciding that their locations were too unsafe, they encamped in the courtyard of the Baguio Cathedral, which was located on higher ground. They were later joined by Lt. Benjamin Magalong, of the Philippine Constabulary detachment in Buguias, Benguet, who had defected from the government, gone to the nearby Central Police Station in Baguio, and disarmed its personnel to prevent any untoward incidents while Baguio residents continued to gather at the cathedral to protest the abuses of the Marcos administration. The Baguio Cathedral, and Session Road adjacent to it, thus became the center of the People Power revolution in Baguio - paralleling similar protests in Cebu, Davao, Bacolod, Manila, and other major Philippine cities, eventually leading to the ouster of President Ferdinand Marcos on February 25, 1986.

On July 15, 1987, President Corazon Aquino issued Executive Order 220 which created the Cordillera Administrative Region, and made the Highly urbanized city of Baguio its seat of government. Various attempts at legally turning the Cordillera Administrative Region into an autonomous region have been pursued, but failed to gather enough public support in two separate autonomy plebiscites.

The 1990 Luzon earthquake ( = 7.7) destroyed some parts of Baguio and the surrounding province of Benguet on the afternoon of July 16, 1990. A significant number of buildings and infrastructure were damaged, including the Hyatt Terraces Plaza, Nevada Hotel, Baguio Park Hotel, FRB Hotel and Baguio Hilltop Hotel; major highways were temporarily blocked due to landslides and pavement breakup; and a number of houses were leveled or severely shaken with numerous casualties. Some of the fallen buildings were built on or near fault lines; local architects later admitted structural building codes should have been followed more religiously, particularly regarding concrete and rebar standards, and "soft stories." Baguio has been rebuilt with aid from the national government and international donors such as Japan, Singapore and the United States.

Geography

The city is enclosed by the province of Benguet. Most of the developed part of the city is built on uneven, hilly terrain of the northern section.

Barangays
Baguio is composed of 129 barangays. They are led by their own captains assisted by a 7-man barangay council.

 A. Bonifacio-Caguioa-Rimando 
 Abanao-Zandueta-Kayong-Chugum-Otek 
 Alfonso Tabora
 Ambiong
 Andres Bonifacio 
 Apugan-Loakan
 Asin Road
 Atok Trail
 Aurora Hill Proper 
 Aurora Hill, North Central
 Aurora Hill, South Central
 Bagong Lipunan 
 Bakakeng Central
 Bakakeng North
 Bal-Marcoville 
 Balsigan
 Bayan Park East
 Bayan Park Village
 Bayan Park West 
 BGH Compound
 Brookside
 Brookspoint
 Cabinet Hill-Teacher's Camp
 Camdas Subdivision
 Camp 7
 Camp 8
 Camp Allen
 Campo Filipino
 City Camp Central
 City Camp Proper
 Country Club Village
 Cresencia Village
 Dagsian, Lower
 Dagsian, Upper
 Dizon Subdivision
 Dominican Hill-Mirador
 Dontogan
 DPS Compound
 Engineers' Hill
 Fairview Village
 Ferdinand 
 Fort del Pilar
 Gabriela Silang
 General Emilio F. Aguinaldo 
 General Luna, Upper
 General Luna, Lower
 Gibraltar
 Greenwater Village
 Guisad Central
 Guisad Sorong
 Happy Hollow
 Happy Homes 
 Harrison-Claudio Carantes
 Hillside
 Holy Ghost Extension
 Holy Ghost Proper
 Honeymoon 
 Imelda R. Marcos 
 Imelda Village
 Irisan
 Kabayanihan
 Kagitingan
 Kayang Extension
 Kayang-Hilltop
 Kias
 Legarda-Burnham-Kisad
 Liwanag-Loakan
 Loakan Proper
 Lopez Jaena
 Lourdes Subdivision Extension
 Lourdes Subdivision, Lower
 Lourdes Subdivision, Proper
 Lualhati
 Lucnab
 Magsaysay Private Road
 Magsaysay, Lower
 Magsaysay, Upper
 Malcolm Square-Perfecto 
 Manuel A. Roxas
 Market Subdivision, Upper
 Middle Quezon Hill Subdivision 
 Military Cut-off
 Mines View Park
 Modern Site, East
 Modern Site, West
 MRR-Queen of Peace
 New Lucban
 Outlook Drive
 Pacdal
 Padre Burgos
 Padre Zamora
 Palma-Urbano 
 Phil-Am
 Pinget
 Pinsao Pilot Project
 Pinsao Proper
 Poliwes
 Pucsusan
 Quezon Hill Proper
 Quezon Hill, Upper
 Quirino Hill, East
 Quirino Hill, Lower
 Quirino Hill, Middle
 Quirino Hill, West
 Quirino-Magsaysay, Upper 
 Rizal Monument Area
 Rock Quarry, Lower
 Rock Quarry, Middle
 Rock Quarry, Upper
 Saint Joseph Village
 Salud Mitra
 San Antonio Village
 San Luis Village
 San Roque Village
 San Vicente
 Sanitary Camp, North
 Sanitary Camp, South
 Santa Escolastica
 Santo Rosario
 Santo Tomas Proper
 Santo Tomas School Area
 Scout Barrio
 Session Road Area
 Slaughter House Area 
 SLU-SVP Housing Village
 South Drive
 Teodora Alonzo
 Trancoville
 Victoria Village

Proposed merger of barangays
A proposed merging of the city's 130 barangays had not been implemented since its inception in 2000. Several local officials stressed that many of the city's barangays did not comply with the minimum requirements in the Local Government Code of the Philippines that a highly urbanized city must have a certified population of least 5,000 inhabitants. According to Mayor Mauricio Domogan, in the past, benefits granted to local governments were based on the number of existing barangays. This led former local officials to create as many barangays as possible in the city in order to acquire additional benefits from the national government. The proposed merger, which will reduce the barangays from 130 to about 40 to 50 by merging adjacent ones, is believed to solve several issues concerning barangay boundary disputes, seemingly biased allocation of funds for larger barangays in relation to barangays with lesser area and population, as well as the inadequate honorarium of barangay officials.

Climate

Under the Köppen climate classification, Baguio features a tropical monsoon climate (Köppen climate classification: Am). The city is known for its mild climate owing to its high elevation. The temperature in the city is usually about  cooler than the temperature in the lowland area. The temperature seldom exceeds  even during the warmest part of the year.

Precipitation
Like many other cities with a subtropical highland climate, Baguio receives noticeably less precipitation during its dry season. However, the city has an extraordinary amount of precipitation during the rainy season from June to October.

Environment

Pollution 
Baguio suffers from air pollution and is one of the cities with the dirtiest air in the country according to a 2014 WHO report. A slight improvement in the city's air quality was cited in 2017 by the DENR's Environmental Management Bureau. In a 2018 WHO report, the city was again listed among 8 other cities alongside Cebu, Dagupan, Davao, Manila, San Carlos, Urdaneta and Zamboanga. Eco-vehicles and Euro 4 compliant vehicles have been tested whether or not they are suited for the city's steep slopes in line with efforts to modernize its Public Utility Vehicles (PUVs). Public Utility Vehicles, specifically jeepneys have been pushed for its modernization, in line with President Duterte's PUV modernization initiative.

Another problem that plagues the city is its garbage and waste disposal. The city has been dumping its garbage in a landfill in Urdaneta City, but rising costs are putting a strain on the city's budget. In early 2018, the city government started using its garbage transfer station in the city outskirts near Marcos Highway, drawing protests from residents of the nearby town of Tuba, who cited the facility poses health hazards to their communities. As of 2019, the Philippine National Oil Company (PNOC) has offered to test a waste-to-energy technology as a possible solution to its garbage woes. The city's waste water treatment plant is also eyed for an expansion as it not been able to fully cater to the city's needs. Those which the plant have not been able to cater to were dumped in the Balili River, leading to its high coliform levels, even higher than that of Manila Bay's.

Landscape 
Baguio is also a planned city. American Architect and Urban Planner Daniel Burnham was commissioned to design the new capital. His design for the city was based on the City Beautiful movement, which features broad streets and avenues radiating out from rectangles.

During the Second World War, Baguio was razed to the ground during the Japanese forces' invasion and the subsequent shelling by American forces during the liberation. After the liberation, rebuilding began and most of the historical buildings were thoroughly reconstructed. However, some of the historic buildings from the 19th century that had been preserved in reasonably reconstructible form were nonetheless eradicated or otherwise left to deteriorate. During the 1990 Luzon earthquake, it further devastated Baguio's old buildings. A total of 28 collapsed buildings, including hotels, factories, and government and university buildings, as well as many private homes and establishments resulted from the quake.

Baguio's current landscape is mostly of contemporary architecture.

Architecture 
Baguio's contemporary architecture is largely of American build, owing to the fact that Americans were the ones to establish a station here. A few examples include those built at Teacher's Camp and Camp John Hay, previous American installations in the city as well as the current Baguio City Hall. Some buildings are also influenced by Spanish building concepts, such as Porta Vaga Mall and La Azotea. One of the more modern buildings in the city is SM City Baguio, established back in 2003.

Moves by various groups with the goal to preserve these buildings have been made. Baguio City Hall, being a historic building, has faced opposition to renovation of its grounds, since that may be against laws on national cultural heritage sites. The renovations, however, continued as there has been no documentation that supports Baguio City Hall as a national heritage site. The construction of the park was finished in May 2019 as was said to define the city's new moniker as a creative center for crafts and folk arts.

Demographics

The original inhabitants of Baguio are the Ibaloi people (natively pronounced as "Ivadoi"). When the Americans established the city in the early 1900s, early settlers in the city include members of other Igorot tribes (Igudut in Ibaloi), the lowlander Ilocanos (Iduko), Americans (Merikano), and mestizos. A significant number of Chinese and Japanese laborers were also hired to build Kennon Road, many of whom later settled in the city.

The city's population as of May 2000 was placed at 250,000 persons. The city has a very young age structure as 65.5 percent of its total population is below thirty years old. Females comprise 51.3 percent of the population as against 48.7 percent for males. The household population comprises 98 percent of the total population or 245,000 persons. With an average of 4.6 members per household, a total of 53,261 household are gleaned. During the peak of the annual tourist influx, particularly during the Lenten period, transients triple the population.

Crime 
Crime in Baguio is concentrated in theft and vehicular accidents. Crime in the city is also directly related to its changing demographics and unique criminal justice system. The illegal drug trade is also a problem of the city as 24 of its 129 barangays are considered as drug affected as of December 2017.

In 2018, Baguio was listed as one of the safest cities both in the ASEAN region, ranking sixth with a crime index of 40.57 and safety index of 59.43. The Baguio City Police Office also has the highest crime solution efficiency nationwide of 84%, compared to the national 77% and the region's 70%. In May 2019 BCPO also reported a drop of 27% in crimes, from 1,150 in 2018 to 834 in 2019. The BCPO was awarded as the country's best city police station in 2018.

Religion

Christianity 

Other faiths 
As of 2015, Muslims comprise  of the city's total population. The largest mosque in the area is Masjid Al-Maarif, which is a centre of Islamic studies in the Philippines. The city also has smaller numbers of Buddhists and atheists, along with members of other faiths.

Economy

Baguio is the melting pot of different peoples and cultures in the Cordillera Administrative Region. Because of this, numerous investments and business opportunities are lured to the city. Baguio has a large retail industry, with shoppers coming to the city to take advantage of the diversity of competitively priced commercial products on sale. The city is also popular with bargain hunters. Some of the most popular bargaining areas include Baguio Market and Maharlika Livelihood Center. The city is home to numerous shopping centers and malls catering to increasing commercial and tourist activity; these include: SM City Baguio, Baguio Center Mall, Abanao Square, and Tiong San.

Various food and retail businesses run by local residents proliferate, forming a key part of Baguio's cultural landscape. Several retail outlets and dining outlets are situated along Bonifacio Street, Session Road, Teacher's Camp, Mines View Park and Baguio Fastfood Center near the market.

The areas of Session Road, Harrison Road, Magsaysay Avenue and Abanao Street comprise the trade center of the city, where commercial and business structures such as cinemas, hotels, restaurants, department stores, and shopping centers are concentrated. The City Market offers a wide array of locally sourced goods and products, usually from Benguet province, which includes colorful woven fabrics and hand-strung beads to primitive wood carvings, cut flowers, strawberries and "Baguio" vegetables, the latter often denoting vegetable types that do well in the cooler growing climate. Strawberries and string beans—referred to as Baguio beans across the Philippines—are shipped to major urban markets across the archipelago.

Another key source of income for Baguio is its position as the economic hub of the Cordillera Administrative Region. The economy of the city has benefited from the vibrant mining industry in several towns of Benguet. Many agricultural goods produced in Benguet pass through Baguio for processing, sale or further distribution to the lowlands.

Industrial
Baguio is one of the country's most profitable and best investment areas.

A Philippine Economic Zone Authority (PEZA)-accredited business and industrial park called the Baguio City Economic Zone (BCEZ) is located in the southern part of the city between Camp John Hay Country Club and Philippine Military Academy in Barangay Loakan. Firms located in the BCEZ mostly produce and export knitted clothing, transistors, small components for vehicles, electronics and computer parts. Notable firms include Texas Instruments Philippines, which is the second largest exporter in the country. Other companies headquartered within the economic zone include Baguio Ayalaland Technohub, Moog Philippines, Inc., Linde Philippines, Inc., LTX Philippines Corporation, Texas Instruments Philippines, and Sitel Philippines, Baguio.

Outsourcing
Outsourcing also contributes to the city's economy and employment. Sitel, whose main office is located in the Baguio City Economic Zone, is the largest BPO company in the city with four sites established within the BCEZ. There are also multiple BPOs present in the city with numerous PEZA-accredited private economic zones established to cater to this industry. The Ayala Technohub located in Camp John Hay hosts Cocentrix and InterContinental Hotels Group alongside other commercial establishments. Teleperformance Baguio and Thoughtfocus is established at the SM Cyberzone Building (also known as SM Fiesta Strip) located in front of Sunshine Park, while other call centers downtown are Optimum Transsource, Sterling Global and Global Translogic. Tech-Synergy operates a large transcription and back office operation near Wright park.

In recent years, there has been a surge of ESL (English as a Second Language) Tutorial Schools throughout Baguio that caters to students from other countries and also provide online services. This industry however has been hit hard by the COVID-19 pandemic with foreign students returning to their home countries.

Culture

Arts and museums 

The city became a haven for many Filipino artists in the 1970s–1990s. Drawn by the cool climate and low cost of living, artists such as Ben Cabrera (now a National Artist) and filmmaker Butch Perez relocated to the city. At the same time, locals such as mixed-media artist Santiago Bose and filmmaker Kidlat Tahimik were also establishing work in the city. Even today, artists like painters and sculptors from all over the country are drawn to the Baguio Arts Festival which is held annually. The city houses several museums, such as the Baguio Museum, Museo Kordilyera, Emilio F. Aguinaldo Museum, the Laperal White House and the SLU Museum of Arts and Cultures.

Baguio has been included in UNESCO's Creative Cities Network due to craft and folk art traditions of the city particularly ranging on expressions to wood carving, silver craft, traditional weaving and tattooing. Baguio is the first city in the Philippines to be part of the inter-city network which aims to promote the creative industries as well as integrate culture in sustainable urban development.

Languages 
The languages commonly spoken in Baguio are Ibaloi, Kankana-ey, Ilocano, Tagalog, and Pangasinan.

Festivities and holidays 

The Panagbenga Festival, the annual Flower Festival, held in February, was created to highlight the city's flowers and cool temperature and as a way to rise up from the devastation of the 1990 Luzon earthquake. The festival includes floats that are covered mostly with flowers not unlike those used in Pasadena's Rose Parade. The festival also includes street dancing, presented by dancers clad in flower-inspired costumes, that is inspired by the Bendian, an Ibaloi dance of celebration that came from the Cordillera region. The indigenous people were initially wary with government-led tourism due to a perceived threat that the government would interfere with or change their communities' rituals.

The city also celebrates its city charter anniversary every September 1 and has been declared as a special non-working holiday by virtue of RA 6710 in 1989.

Tourism 

Tourism is one of Baguio's main industries due to its cool climate and history. The city is one of the country's top tourist destinations. During the year end holidays some people from the lowlands prefer spending their vacation in Baguio, to experience cold temperatures they rarely have in their home provinces. Also, during summer, especially during Holy Week, tourists from all over the country flock to the city. During this time, the total number of people in the city doubles. To accommodate all these people there are more than 80 hotels and inns available, as well as numerous transient houses set up by the locals. Local festivities such as the Panagbenga Festival also attracts both local and foreign tourists.

Baguio is the lone Philippine destination in the 2011 TripAdvisor Traveller's Choice Destinations Awards (Asia category) with the city being among the top 25 destinations in Asia. Burnham Park, Mines View Park, Wright Park, The Mansion, and Botanical Garden are among the popular tourist sites in Baguio.

Government

Baguio is led by its own mayor and vice mayor. The vice mayor leads the city council, composed of 12 elected councilors and 2 ex-officio members (the ABC President and SK President of the city). It is represented in the House of Representatives by its own congressman, the city itself a lone district, separate from the province of Benguet. The city officials are term-limited by up to 3 consecutive terms, with each term lasting for 3 years.

As a highly urbanized city with its own charter, it is not subject to the jurisdiction of Benguet province, of which it was formerly a part. The City Government holds office at the Baguio City Hall.

Elected officials
The city's government's composition as of June 30, 2022

Summer residences 
The city hosts the summer residences of the President, Vice President, Senate President and House Speaker at Barangay Lualhati, while the Supreme Court, Court of Appeals and the Cabinet Secretaries cottages are housed at Cabinet Hill. The Supreme Court and Court of Appeals hold summer sessions in the city, usually during the month of April.

Sports

Baguio has hosted several sporting events, even those of international standing. The Baguio Athletic Bowl within the grounds of Burnham Park is one of Baguio's primary sporting venues. Baguio hosted the 1978 World Chess Championship match between Anatoly Karpov and Viktor Korchnoi, building the Baguio Convention Center for that purpose. The city is a participant in the CARAA games or the Cordillera Administrative Region Athletic Association, hosting it last in 2016 and 2017. The winners of the said event will eventually represent the region in the annual Palarong Pambansa games, which is also sponsored by the Department of Education. As of 2019, the city is still the overall champion with 205 gold, 110 silver and 79 bronze medals.

In recent years, Baguio has been racking up titles and medals in the field of Mixed Martial Arts led by Team Lakay.

Infrastructure

Transportation

Air
Loakan Airport is the lone airport serving the general area of Baguio. The airport is classified as a trunkline airport, or a major commercial domestic airport, by the Civil Aviation Authority of the Philippines. Major commercial operations to Baguio however ceased after Philippine Airlines closed their Baguio route in 1998. There were attempts to reopen Baguio routes throughout the following two decades by different airline operators such as Asian Spirit and Sky Pasada but none were able to sustain continuous operation. Commercial flights have once again resumed in 2022 with Philippine Airlines operating Baguio–Cebu flights and vice-versa.

The airport is located south of the city center. The airport is used primarily by helicopters, turbo-prop and piston engine aircraft, although on rare occasions light business jets (LBJ) have flown into the airport.

Land
Jeepneys and taxis are the main means of public transportation in the city. The government's push for jeepney modernization has led to an increase of modern EURO 4 compliant PUVs plying Baguio's center. The rollout however for full jeepney modernization had been hampered by the COVID-19 pandemic. There are several bus lines linking Baguio with Manila, Bontoc, Mariveles, Olongapo, Cabanatuan, and provinces such as Pangasinan, Pampanga, Bataan, Nueva Ecija, Aurora, Cavite, La Union, Nueva Vizcaya and those in the Ilocos regions. Notable bus lines that operate the Baguio to Manila routes are Victory Liner, Genesis Transport Service and its premium bus line Joybus, and Pangasinan Solid North.

From Metro Manila, Baguio is accessible via NLEX (from Bulacan to Pampanga), SCTEX (Pampanga to Tarlac) and TPLEX (from Tarlac to La Union). The three main access roads leading to Baguio from the lowlands are Kennon Road (formerly known as the Benguet Road), Aspiras–Palispis Highway (previously known as Marcos Highway) and Naguilian Road, also known as Quirino Highway. The newest road that connects the city to the lowlands is Asin Road (also known as Asin-San Pascual-Tubao, La Union Road). All these roads traverse the municipality of Tuba, Benguet.

 Kennon Road starts in Rosario, La Union and winds upwards through a narrow, steep valley. This is often the fastest route to Baguio but it is particularly perilous, with landslides during the rainy season and sharp dropoffs, some without guardrails. The recently passed Republic Act No. 11604 pushes for the full rehabilitation of Kennon Road as an all-weather highway.
 Aspiras-Palispis Highway starts in Agoo, La Union and connects to Palispis Highway, at the boundary of Benguet and La Union provinces.
 Asin-Tubao Road starts in Tubao, La Union and serves as secondary alternative road if gridlock occurs at Aspiras-Palispis Highway
 Naguilian Road, which starts in Bauang, La Union, are both longer routes but are much safer than Kennon Road especially during rainy season, and are the preferred routes for coaches, buses and trucks.

The Benguet-Nueva Vizcaya Road, which links Baguio to Aritao in Nueva Vizcaya province, traverses the towns of Itogon, Bokod, and Kayapa.

Another road, Halsema Highway, (also known as the Baguio-Bontoc Road or the Mountain Trail) leads north through the mountainous portion of the provinces of Benguet and Mountain Province; it starts at the northern border of Baguio with La Trinidad.

HoHo Bus
In an effort to address traffic congestion and the lack of car parking at tourist spots in the city, Baguio operates a free bus shuttle service called the Hop On, Hop Off (HoHo) Tourist Bus. Through a park and ride scheme, the service encourages tourists with private vehicles to park their vehicles at the Baguio Convention Center (BCC) for a fee and ride the bus to various tourists sites free of charge. Relaunched on July 15, 2022, the HoHo bus has scheduled departure and arrival times, operating a looped route between the BCC, the Baguio Botanical Garden, the Mansion House, Mines View Park, Wright Park, and Governor Pack Road. The bus service has an estimated waiting interval of 30 minutes and is operational from 8:30 AM to 6:20 PM daily.

All times are in Philippine Standard Time (UTC+08:00).

Possible future modes 

 Cable Cars - As of July 8, 2019, Secretary Tugade of the Department of Transportation said that the feasibility study for the installation of the cable cars in Manila may be finished within the year, with Baguio soon to follow. The Philippine government earlier secured a P27 million grant from France for this venture, with Manila and Baguio seen as possible initial sites.
 Monorail - A monorail project from Baguio to La Trinidad is being mulled over by the SSS as a possible investment in CAR. It is seen to further boost tourism and decongest traffic. The project is similar to the one installed by the Department of Science and Technology at the UP Campus in 2012.

Water and electricity 
Most of the water supply of the city is provided for by the Baguio Water District, founded in 1975 as the successor to the now-defunct Department of Public Services. It currently operates 60 deep wells to cater to its more than 300,000 consumers. It currently serves 122 out of the 129 barangays in the city and some parts of Tuba, Benguet. In recent years, the BWD has expressed concern over the city's depleting water supply, due in part to the private wells dug by private individuals and companies.

Electric services are provided by Benguet Electric Cooperative (BENECO), the sole electric power distributor in Benguet. In 2012, a bill was filled in the House of Representatives seeking the creation of the Baguio Electric Cooperative or BAELCO, an entity to provide for the city's own electricity needs, separate from BENECO. Its creation has been met with opposition by various groups citing the need of a feasibility study on the separation. The creation of a separate electric franchise for Baguio would also infringe on BENECO's existing franchise that mandated BENECO to provide electricity for both Baguio and Benguet which would create legal implications if it was to be amended.

The city is also the only local government unit to own and operate its own renewable energy plant. Originally constructed in the 1920s, the Asin Mini Hydropower Plants 1, 2 and 3 located in Tuba, Benguet came under the city's possession after the lapse of the 25-year lease agreement with the Aboitiz-owned Hydroelectric Development Corporation (HEDCOR). The plant acted as both a power source and another income-generating asset of the city as BENECO was also its main client. The power plant however was forced to cease operation on 2015 when the Energy Regulatory Commission issued a cease-and-desist order to the city due to the lack of a certificate of compliance from the city. The city currently has plans to rehabilitate the power plants so that they could resume operations once again.

Healthcare 

Baguio's healthcare is mainly provided by various private corporations. Private hospitals that operates in the city are the Baguio Medical Center, BCU-Santo Niño de Jesus Medical Center Foundation, Notre Dame de Chartres Hospital, Pines City Doctors' Hospital and Saint Louis University's Hospital of Sacred Heart. The BCU-Santo Niño de Jesus Medical Center Foundation ceased operations on 2009 due to financial reasons but was reopened during the COVID-19 pandemic with the local government refurbishing it as an isolation center for COVID-19 patients. In early 2019, several groups were eyeing to establish a hospital in Barangay Scout Barrio, however, it was met with opposition. As of March 2019, the project has been shelved.

The Baguio City Health Services Office is the office responsible for the health care programs provided by the city government, operating 16 health centers and 15 satellite clinics. Baguio hosts the Baguio General Hospital and Medical Center or BGHMC, a tertiary state-owned hospital administered and operated by the Department of Health. It is the sole government hospital in the city as well as the largest government tertiary hospital in the entire CAR region.

Education

Education is a major contributor to the economy of Baguio. Considered as the "Educational Center of the North", the city has a transient student population who migrate to the city to attend tertiary education.

Baguio is the center of education in the Northern Philippines due to high performances in various professional licensure exams as well as adherence to high educational quality standards, housing some of the best and largest universities in Northern Luzon.

Elementary and secondary 
The city has several public and private elementary and secondary schools. There are currently 45 public elementary schools and 21 public secondary schools in the city. Most of its secondary private schools are divisions of the private universities of the city. The Philippine Science High School - CAR campus was established in the city on 2009 and is located in Irisan. In 2016, the city government established in Irisan the Baguio City Science High School to create a unified science high school campus.

Universities 
The city houses eight major institutions of higher education. Baguio's first private school, Easter College, was set up in 1906 by the Rt. Rev. Charles Brent, who was a bishop of the Episcopalian Church.

The University of the Philippines, the country's premier state university, was established as an extension campus in Vigan, Ilocos Sur before transferring to Baguio in 1938. In 1961, it became a branch campus of UP Diliman, before finally becoming UP Baguio in 2002.

Saint Louis University, the largest university both in the city and in the north of Manila, catering to over 30,000 students, was founded by Belgian CICM missionaries in 1911 initially as a one-storey school for boys. It became a college in the 1950s before becoming a university in 1963. It currently has 4 campuses spread across the city.

Baguio Central University was found on 1945 as the Centro Academy by the Fernandez family. The following year, another educational institution, the University of the Cordilleras was established as the Baguio Colleges before becoming the Baguio Colleges Foundation; it became a full-fledged university in 2003. The University of Baguio was set up as the Baguio Technical and Commercial Institute in 1948 by the Bautista family; it was upgraded to university status in 1969.

Mainly a nursing and medical school, Pines City Colleges was founded in 1969 as the Pines City Doctors Hospital School of Nursing, three years after the opening of Pines City Doctors' Hospital in 1966.

The Philippine Military Academy, the country's military school, was originally founded in the Walled City of Intramuros in 1907, before relocating to Baguio in 1908 where it has been since.

Notable people

Twin towns and sister cities

Local

 Angeles City
 Alaminos, Pangasinan
 Bacolod
 Calbayog, Samar
 Candon
 Daet, Camarines Norte
 Davao City
 Dipaculao, Aurora
 Lopez, Quezon
 Lucena
 Makati
 Mandaue
 Marawi, Lanao del Sur
 Muñoz, Nueva Ecija
 Ormoc, Leyte
 Pavia, Iloilo
 San Carlos, Negros Occidental
 Zamboanga City

International

  Cusco, Peru
  Gongju, South Korea
  Hangzhou, China
  Hanyū, Saitama, Japan
  Honolulu, Hawaii, United States
  Karuizawa, Nagano, Japan
  Nazareth, Israel
  Vaughan, Canada
  Seoul, South Korea
  Shepparton, Australia
  Taebaek, South Korea
    Tamuning, Guam, United States
  Taxco, Mexico
  Vallejo, California, United States
  Wakkanai, Hokkaido, Japan

See also

 Capital of the Philippines
 Daniel Burnham
 Hill station
 Kennon Road
 La Trinidad
 Sagada
 Banaue
 Session Road

References

External links

 
 [ Philippine Standard Geographic Code]
 Baguio at OpenStreetMap

 
Populated places in Benguet
Cities in the Cordillera Administrative Region
Highly urbanized cities in the Philippines
Mountain resorts in the Philippines
Planned cities in the Philippines
Populated places established in 1909
1909 establishments in the Philippines
Former provincial capitals of the Philippines